Loh Ah Chee (1 April 1922 – 31 October 1997) was a Malaysian sports shooter. He competed in the 25 metre pistol event at the 1964 Summer Olympics.

References

1922 births
1997 deaths
Malaysian male sport shooters
Olympic shooters of Malaysia
Shooters at the 1964 Summer Olympics
Place of birth missing